The 2002 U.S. Women's Open was the 57th U.S. Women's Open, held July 4–7 in Kansas at Prairie Dunes Country Club, northeast of Hutchinson, about forty miles (65 km) northwest of Wichita.

Juli Inkster won her second U.S. Women's Open, two strokes ahead of runner-up Annika Sörenstam, the 54-hole leader. Inkster, 42, shot a final round 66 (−4) to gain her seventh and final major title. She joined Babe Zaharias as the only women to win two majors after age 

This was the first purse of $3 million at the U.S. Women's Open, it had tripled in the seven years since 1995, the first seven-figure purse.

Course layout

Source:

Past champions in the field

Made the cut

Missed the cut

Source:

Round summaries

First round
Thursday, July 4, 2002

Source:

Second round
Friday, July 5, 2002

Source:

Third round
Saturday, July 6, 2002

Source:

Final round
Sunday, July 7, 2002

Source:

Scorecard

Cumulative tournament scores, relative to par

Source:

References

External links

U.S. Women's Open - past champions - 2002
Prairie Dunes Country Club

U.S. Women's Open
Golf in Kansas
Sports competitions in Kansas
U.S. Women's Open
U.S. Women's Open
U.S. Women's Open
U.S. Women's Open
Women's sports in Kansas